Bisira is a town in the Ngöbe Buglé Comarca of Panama. It is located in the north east part of the country by the beach.

References

Sources 
World Gazeteer: Panama – World-Gazetteer.com

Populated places in Ngöbe-Buglé Comarca